Rolandi is a surname. Notable people with the surname include:

Carlo Rolandi (1926–2020), Italian sailor
Gianna Rolandi (1952–2021), American soprano
Sergio Rolandi (1927–1995), Italian sport shooter 

Italian-language surnames
Patronymic surnames
Surnames from given names